Jardín de Esculturas is a museum in the city of Xalapa, in the state of Veracruz in eastern Mexico. It is a sculptural garden, exhibiting works by nationally and internationally recognized artists.

References

Art museums and galleries in Mexico
Sculpture gardens, trails and parks in North America
Gardens in Mexico
Museums in Veracruz
Xalapa